The 2003 AFC Women's Championship was a women's football tournament held in Thailand from 8 to 21 June 2003. It was the 14th holding of the AFC Women's Championship, a tournament for women's national teams from countries affiliated to the Asian Football Confederation.

The competition was held in Bangkok in the Rajamangala Stadium and in Nakhon Sawan in the Nakhon Sawan Stadium. The tournament was won by the defending champions North Korea women's national football team (Korea DPR). As the championship was also used for qualifying for the FIFA Women's World Cup, North Korea qualified as champions, China qualifying as runners-up, and South Korea qualifying as the third-placed team. Japan as the fourth-placed team faced another match for qualification.

Participating teams and structure
Fourteen teams took part in the competition. This included the hosts Thailand and the defending champions North Korea. The teams were split into 3 groups, with the each team playing all the others in the group in a round robin format. At the end of the group stage the four teams with the best results from all the groups who qualified in the 1st 2 spaces in each group qualify to the knockout stage. This is played in the format of a semi-final, a 3rd/4th place match, as well as a final.

The winners and runners-up of the competition automatically qualify for the FIFA Women's World Cup 2003. The 3rd place team has to compete against a CONCACAF team over home and away matches for a final place in the FIFA Women's World Cup. The runners-up and the 3rd place team were re-berthed to 3rd and 4th place respectively as China, as original host of the World Cup and would automatically qualified to final rounds, got 2nd place.

This was the last tournament to still issue invitation. From 2006, a separate qualification round was introduced to find out teams to qualify for the Women's Asian Cup.

Stadium
 Rajamangala Stadium
 Nakhon Sawan Stadium

Group stage

Group A

Group B

Group C

Knockout stage

Semi-finals
Winners qualified for 2003 FIFA Women's World Cup

Third place match
Winner qualified for 2003 FIFA Women's World Cup. Loser entered CONCACAF–AFC play-off.

Final

Awards

Goalscorers

External links
 Match results at the official AFC web site
 Results at RSSSF

Women's Championship
AFC Women's Asian Cup tournaments
2003 FIFA Women's World Cup qualification
International association football competitions hosted by Thailand
Afc
AFC Women's Championship
AFC Women's Championship
AFC Championship